Valeriya Andreyevna Engalycheva (Romanian: Valeria Engalîceva; born 7 April 1999), known professionally as Lerika, is a Moldovan-Russian singer and songwriter. She represented Moldova in the Junior Eurovision Song Contest 2011 with the song "No-No", and Russia in the 2012 contest with "Sensatsiya". This made her the second Junior Eurovision Song Contest entrant to compete twice (The first being Russia in 2009 and 2011 with Ekaterina Ryabova), and the first to represent two different countries.

Life and work
Engalycheva was born in Olomouc, in the Czech Republic, to a Russian family. She first began singing at the age of four. She moved to Moldova at a young age, where her grandmother lived, and then moved to Russia with her family at age 13, settling in Moscow. Throughout her childhood, Engalycheva participated in a number of European singing competitions, including Slavianski Bazaar in Vitebsk, Orpheus in Italy, New Wave Junior, and Kinotavrik.

At age 12, Engalycheva was selected to represent Moldova at the Junior Eurovision Song Contest 2011 in Yerevan, with the song "No-No". She ultimately placed sixth, earning 78 points; this became Moldova's most successful participation in the contest to date. After moving to Russia in 2012, Engalycheva competed in the Russian national final for the Junior Eurovision Song Contest 2012 in Amsterdam, with the song "Sensatsiya". She went on to win the competition, earning the right to represent Russia; this made Engalycheva the second artist to compete at the Junior Eurovision Song Contest twice, and the first to represent two different countries. She ultimately placed fourth, receiving 88 points.

Engalycheva is a student at Moscow Art Theatre School, where she is set to graduate in 2023. She speaks Russian, English, Romanian, and French, and has released music in Russian, English, and Romanian.

In 2022, Engalycheva was a contestant on the tenth season of Vocea României (The Voice of Romania). As part of Irina Rimes's team, she got to the Battles round, before being eliminated.

Discography

Singles

References

External links
 Unofficial website

1999 births
21st-century Russian women singers
21st-century Russian singers
Child pop musicians
Junior Eurovision Song Contest entrants for Russia
Living people
Moldovan child singers
Moldovan emigrants to Russia
Moldovan expatriates in the Czech Republic
21st-century Moldovan women singers
Moldovan people of Russian descent
Musicians from Moscow
Musicians from Olomouc
Russian child singers
Russian expatriates in the Czech Republic
Russian pop singers